Hugh "Hughie" Clifford (8 April 1873 – 1929) was a Scottish footballer, who played for Hibernian, Stoke, Celtic, Motherwell, Liverpool and Manchester City.

Career
Clifford started his career Carfin Shamrock before joining Hibernian in 1887. In 1890 he moved south and joined Football Alliance side Stoke with whom he helped win the title. Midway through the 1891–92 season Clifford returned to Scotland and signed for Celtic in what was an "Illegal" transfer and he was suspended from English football for two years. He signed for Liverpool in May 1892 but never played a game as his transfer was "illegal" as he had already played for Celtic the previous week and the deal fell through. He returned to Stoke in 1893 and played one match in the 1893–94 season. He then went on to play for Motherwell, and spent the 1895–96 season with Manchester City.

Career statistics
Source:

Honours
with Stoke
Football Alliance champions: 1890–91

References

External links
 Hugh Clifford at The Celtic Wiki

1873 births
1929 deaths
Scottish footballers
Hibernian F.C. players
Celtic F.C. players
Stoke City F.C. players
Motherwell F.C. players
Liverpool F.C. players
Manchester City F.C. players
Scottish Football League players
English Football League players
Association football wing halves
Football Alliance players
Footballers from North Lanarkshire